The East Channel Bridge is a bridge carrying Interstate 90 from Mercer Island, Washington, to Bellevue, Washington, over the East Channel of Lake Washington, which separates Mercer Island from the rest of the Eastside.

The original bridge was opened November 10, 1923, and was the first bridge to reach the island. George Lightfoot, known as the father of the other bridge on Mercer Island, the Lacey V. Murrow Memorial Bridge, had the charge of opening the bridge for boats. In 1940, it was demolished and replaced.  Currently, two parallel bridges carry I-90 traffic at this location.  A steel box girder bridge, built in 1981, carries westbound I-90 traffic and the Mountains to Sound Greenway Trail, also known as the I-90 Trail.  Another steel box girder bridge, built in 1988, carries eastbound I-90 traffic and the under-construction 2 Line of Sound Transit's Link light rail system.

See also
Lacey V. Murrow Memorial Bridge and Homer M. Hadley Memorial Bridge, which carry I-90 over Lake Washington to Seattle.

References

Bridges in King County, Washington
Bridges completed in 1923
Bridges completed in 1940
Road bridges in Washington (state)
Interstate 90
Bridges on the Interstate Highway System
Steel bridges in the United States
Box girder bridges in the United States
1981 establishments in Washington (state)